Daria Govor (born 21 May 1995) is a Russian diver.

Govor began diving when she was 6 years old in Elektrostal and diving helped her to not be afraid of water. She won gold at the 2011 European Diving Championships in 10-meter synchronized diving, alongside Yulia Koltunova. Govor hoped to compete in the 2020 Summer Olympics. She was a team gold medalist at the 2015 Summer Universiade.

References

1995 births
Russian female divers
Living people
Universiade medalists in diving
Universiade gold medalists for Russia
Medalists at the 2015 Summer Universiade
People from Elektrostal
Sportspeople from Moscow Oblast